is a Japanese stage, and voice actress.

Filmography
Mouse (2003 TV series) – Female Newscaster (ep 9), Yumi (ep 8)
Raimuiro Senkitan (2003 TV series) – Rinzu Kuroda, Theme Song Performance 
Raimuiro Senkitan: The South Island Dream Romantic Adventure (2004 OVA series) – Rinzu Kuroda, Theme Song Performance 
Canvas 2: Niji Iro no Sketch (2005 TV series) – Art club member (ep 10, 14, 20)

Singles
 released on December 25, 2002, and ranked 131st in Oricon singles charts.
 image song single of the eponymous character released on July 23, 2003.

References

External links
 {Yuka Aimoto's blog 
 

Year of birth missing (living people)
Living people
Japanese voice actresses
Japanese stage actresses
Actresses from Tokyo